Ramal (Branch) or Línea R (Line R) of the Madrid Metro is a shuttle train connecting the stations of Ópera and Príncipe Pío. It is located in the Centro district of Madrid, Spain. It is currently the only line in the system to be known by a letter instead of a number, and its name  refers to its origins as a branch of Line 2.

Ramal starts at Ópera station in the Plaza de Isabel II, passes under the Plaza de Oriente and the gardens of the Royal Palace of Madrid, and ends at Príncipe Pío station. Since Ramal consists of only two stations, it has only two trains, which pass at the halfway point between the stations. At Ópera, there is only one platform; at Príncipe Pío, there are two platforms, but one is used for train storage. Ramal uses 4-car CAF Series 3000 trains.

History
Ramal opened on 27 December 1925 as a branch of Line 2 providing service to the Estación del Norte (North Station, today Príncipe Pío station), which was one of the city's major long-distance train stations. Since the Estación del Norte was located on the banks of the Manzanares River, Ramal helped travelers avoid climbing the Cuesta de San Vicente, a hillside between the river and the city center.

Ramal's two stations experienced several name changes over the course of their history. Ópera was originally named Isabel II after the Plaza de Isabel II, which was in turn named after Queen Isabella II. After the proclamation of the Second Spanish Republic on 14 April 1931, the new authorities ordered all place names referring to the monarchy to be changed. On 24 June 1931, Isabel II station was renamed Ópera after the nearby Teatro Real opera house. That same year, the plaza was renamed Plaza de Fermín Galán, after Fermín Galán, leader of the failed Jaca uprising of 1930, which sought to overthrow King Alfonso XIII. On 5 June 1937, the station too was renamed Fermín Galán. After the establishment of the Francoist State in 1939, many of the city's place names were changed once again. In 1939, the plaza's name was changed back to Plaza de Isabel II, and the station's name was changed back to Ópera.

In 1995, the Estación del Norte was expanded and remodeled in preparation for the expansion of Line 6, and it was renamed Príncipe Pío after the nearby hill. By this time, Chamartín station, another major long-distance train station located further north, had already been in operation for several decades, so the name Estación del Norte (North Station) was no longer appropriate.

Stations

See also
 Madrid
 Transport in Madrid
 List of Madrid Metro stations
 List of metro systems

References

External links

 
 
 
 

Madrid Metro lines
Railway lines opened in 1925
1925 establishments in Spain